Pao may be:
 Pa'O language, native to Myanmar
 Tai Pao language, native to Vietnam
 Pao language (Venezuela) (unattested)
 Pao language (India) (spurious)

See also
The Languages of Pao